Named after the lead boat, the Sturgeon class of nuclear-powered fast attack submarines (SSN) served with the United States Navy from the late 1960s to the mid-2000s. With a submerged displacement of 4,780 tons, its successors were the 6,920-ton , the first of which was commissioned in 1976. As SSNs, Sturgeon-class submarines were designed to primarily perform anti-submarine warfare operations. Seven different primary contractors constructed the 37 boats of the class, making it the second-most numerous nuclear-powered warship class in the world after the 62-boat Los Angeles class.

In the late 1950s, the U.S. Navy identified the need to reengineer the Thresher/Permit class, the boats of which were then being constructed. In pursuit of high-speed operations, many design aspects were sacrificed. To address such deficiences, the Sturgeon class was created. This class differed from its predecessor by having an enlarged and relocated sail to accommodate additional external sensors; a second periscope was also added. Additionally, the fairwater planes on the sail could be rotated 90 degrees to allow breaking through relatively thin ice. Internally, the class's layout was rearranged to improve habitability and to admit more weapons as compared to its predecessor. Among the range of armaments used by the class were the Mark 48 torpedo, the Harpoon anti-ship missile, the Tomahawk cruise missile, and the SUBROC nuclear anti-submarine missile.

Nine boats incorporated this extension. Other modifications included the addition of a Dry Deck Shelter (an external lockout chamber capable of accommodating SEAL Delivery Vehicles) to six boats to enable covert insertion and extraction of U.S. Navy SEALs.

Boats

In October 1961, General Dynamics Electric Boat was awarded the contract to construct the lead boat of the class, . Laid down in August 1963, the boat was launched in February 1966 before being commissioned in March 1966. Electric Boat would be the largest builder of the class, responsible for twelve boats in total. It was followed by Newport News Shipbuilding (with nine boats), Ingalls Shipbuilding (seven boats), San Francisco Naval Shipyard/Mare Island Naval Shipyard (five boats), General Dynamics Quincy Shipbuilding Division and Portsmouth Naval Shipyard (two boats each). The final boat of the class, was commissioned in August 1975.

 was a significant modification of the Sturgeon design for an experimental propulsion system, and so was a one-ship class.  was also identified as such during her construction, but later was admitted to have been a unique design with very little in common with the Sturgeon class

Originally designed for 20-year operational lives, boats of the Sturgeon class had this lengthened to 30 years, with a further planned three-year extension. However, many boats were retired prior to the limit to avoid costly nuclear refueling. The first to be decommissioned, in October 1991, was USS Sea Devil; the last, was decommissioned in July 2005. By then, the Los Angeles-, Seawolf-, and Virginia-class SSNs had entered service.

Keys

References

Bibliography

External links
 Photo galleries of US nuclear attack submarines at NavSource.org

 

List
Lists of submarines
Sturgeon-Class Submarines